Huis der Boede is a country house near Koudekerke in the Dutch province of Zeeland, erected in 1745 for J. van Mandere, mayor of Vlissingen. For its design, he commissioned the Antwerp architect and sculptor .

External links

Huis de Boede restoration.

Boede, Huis der
Rijksmonuments in Zeeland
Veere